The 2000 Amstel Gold Race was the 35th edition of the annual road bicycle race "Amstel Gold Race", held on Sunday April 22, 2000 in the Dutch province of Limburg. The race stretched 257 kilometres, with the start and finish in Maastricht. There were a total of 191 competitors, with 106 cyclists finishing the race.

Result

External links
Results

Amstel Gold Race
2000 in road cycling
2000 in Dutch sport
Amstel Gold Race
April 2000 sports events in Europe